Legge romanization is a transcription system for Mandarin Chinese, used by the prolific 19th century sinologist James Legge. It was replaced by the Wade–Giles system, which itself has been mostly supplanted by Pinyin. The Legge system is still to be found in Legge's widely available translation of the Yijing, and in some derivative works such as Aleister Crowley's version of the Yijing. The transcription was initially devised by Max Müller for the publication of the multivolumed Sacred Books of the East.

Description 
Although frequently improperly called a "transliteration", Legge's system is a transcription of Chinese, as there can be no transliteration of Chinese script into any phonetic script, like the Latin (or English) alphabet. Any system of romanization of Chinese renders the sounds (pronunciation) and not the characters (written form).

Features of the Legge system include: 
 the use of h to signal consonantal aspiration (so that what Pinyin spells "pi" and Wade–Giles spells "p'i", Legge spells as "phî"), 
 the use of the Fraktur letter z distinct from Roman z and 
 the use of italicized consonants distinct from their normal forms.

Comparing words in the Legge system with the same words in Wade–Giles shows that there are often minor but nonsystematic differences, which makes direct correlation of the systems difficult.

Vowels 
And it uses the following vowels and semivowels:

The vowel letters also occur in various vowel digraphs, including the following:

Consonants 
Legge transcription uses the following consonants:

References

External links
Legge transcription of Yijing hexagram names — alongside their Wade–Giles and Pinyin forms

Romanization of Chinese
I Ching